Christian Früchtl (born 28 January 2000) is a German professional footballer who plays as a goalkeeper for Austrian Bundesliga club Austria Wien. He has represented Germany at various youth levels internationally.

Club career

Youth career
Früchtl began his youth career at hometown club SV Bischofsmais, before moving to SpVgg Grün-Weiss Deggendorf. In 2014, he moved to the youth academy of Bayern Munich.

In 2017, Früchtl won the 2016–17 B-Junioren Bundesliga with Bayern's under-17 team, appearing 14 times during the season. Früchtl also appeared 7 times for Bayern's under-19 team during the 2016–17 season, finishing as runners-up in the A-Junioren Bundesliga.

Bayern Munich
Früchtl began his senior career for Bayern Munich II in the 2017–18 season, making his debut in the Regionalliga Bayern on 15 August 2017 in a 2–2 draw against VfR Garching. He made his professional debut for the reserve team in the 3. Liga on 20 July 2019, starting in the away match against Würzburger Kickers.

On 7 August 2020, Früchtl joined 2. Bundesliga side 1. FC Nürnberg on a season-long loan, however he did not feature in any game nor competitions.

Austria Wien
On 15 June 2022, following the end of the 2021–2022 season Früchtl would join Austrian Bundesliga club Austria Wien.

International career
Früchtl has progressed through some of the Germany national youth teams, including five caps for the under-17 team from 2016 to 2017.

Career statistics

Honours
Bayern Munich
 DFL-Supercup: 2017
 Bundesliga: 2017–18, 2018–19, 2019–20, 2021–22

Bayern Munich II
 Regionalliga Bayern: 2018–19
 3. Liga: 2019–20

References

External links

 Profile at the FC Bayern Munich website
 
 

2000 births
Living people
People from Regen (district)
Sportspeople from Lower Bavaria
Footballers from Bavaria
German footballers
Germany youth international footballers
Association football goalkeepers
FC Bayern Munich II players
FC Bayern Munich footballers
1. FC Nürnberg players
FK Austria Wien players
Bundesliga players
3. Liga players
Regionalliga players
German expatriate footballers
Expatriate footballers in Austria
German expatriate sportspeople in Austria
21st-century German people